Hamilton services is a motorway service station near the town of Hamilton, Scotland. The service station is located next to the M74 motorway between junctions 6 and 5 and may be accessed in the northbound direction only. It is owned by Roadchef.

References

External links 
Hamilton - Motorway Services Online
RoadChef

Motorway service areas in Scotland
RoadChef motorway service stations
Transport in South Lanarkshire
Buildings and structures in Hamilton, South Lanarkshire